Dale Stetina (born July 9, 1956) is an American former racing cyclist, who competed in the late 1970s through the 1980s. He is a two-time U.S. National Road Champion and two-time winner of one of the Coors Classic held in Boulder, Colorado.  He also won the Mount Washington Hillclimb in 1980.

Stetina hails from an Indianapolis, Indiana-based cycling family which includes three brothers: Wayne, Joel, and Troy. Stetina's son, Peter also competes as a professional cyclist. His father Roy was also a state cycling champion of Indiana. In 2007 Stetina was inducted into the U.S. Bicycling Hall of Fame.

Stetina also won the overall classification of Vuelta Ciclista a Costa Rica in December 1980 in addition to three stages.

Major results

1977
 2nd Overall Coors Classic
1978
 1st  Road race, National Amateur Road Championships
1979
 1st Overall Coors Classic
 5th Road race, Pan American Games
1980
 1st  Road race, National Amateur Road Championships
 1st Overall Vuelta Ciclista a Costa Rica
1st Stages 5, 8 & 9
 1st Mount Washington Hillclimb
1981
 1st Stage 3 Coors Classic
1983
 1st Overall Coors Classic
 1st Overall Cascade Classic
1984
 1st Overall Cascade Classic

References

Notes
 Fecoci (Costa Rica Cyclist Association Library), 1980.

External links
 

Living people
1956 births
American male cyclists
American cycling road race champions
Cyclists from Indiana